Ernst Pfister (28 April 1947 – 4 September 2022) was a German politician.

Biography
After earning his Abitur in Villingen-Schwenningen in 1966, Pfister carried out his military service in the Bundeswehr for one year. In 1968, he began his studies in political science, history, and sport at the University of Tübingen and the University of Freiburg.

Pfister joined the Free Democratic Party (FDP) in 1969. In 1980, he was elected to the municipal council of Trossingen as well as the Landtag of Baden-Württemberg. From 1996 to 2004, he chaired the FDP group in the Landtag. On 14 July 2004, he was named Minister of Economics, Labor and Housing of Baden-Württemberg, succeeding , as well as Deputy Minister-President. He retired from politics in 2011.

Pfister died in Trossingen on 4 September 2022, at the age of 75.

References

1947 births
2022 deaths
Free Democratic Party (Germany) politicians
Members of the Landtag of Baden-Württemberg
University of Tübingen alumni
University of Freiburg alumni
People from Tuttlingen (district)
Recipients of the Cross of the Order of Merit of the Federal Republic of Germany
Recipients of the Order of Merit of Baden-Württemberg